Sylvester Morris, Jr. (born October 6, 1977) is a former professional American football wide receiver who played for the Kansas City Chiefs. 

Morris was an alum of McDonogh 35 High School in New Orleans before joining the Jackson State Tigers' football team. Morris was selected by the Chiefs in the first round (21st overall) of the 2000 NFL Draft. In 2000, the only NFL season he actually played, he appeared in 15 games and had 48 receptions for 678 yards (14.1 yards per reception) and 3 touchdowns. 

Morris signed with the Tampa Bay Buccaneers in 2004, though he sustained a season-ending injury during the offseason. His career was cut short by repeated knee injuries causing him to only actually play in one season despite being on the Chiefs roster for four seasons.

References

1977 births
Living people
Players of American football from New Orleans
American football wide receivers
Jackson State Tigers football players
Kansas City Chiefs players